The Federal Building and U.S. Post Office, Spokane, Washington is a historic post office, courthouse, and custom house building at Spokane in Spokane County, Washington. It is a courthouse for the United States District Court for the Eastern District of Washington.

Building history

The Federal Building and U.S. Post Office in Spokane, Washington, opened in October 1909. It was the first major federal building constructed in the "Inland Empire" that encompasses portions of Washington, Oregon, Idaho, and Montana. The growing city of Spokane needed a larger post office and space for Federal offices. The federal government acquired the West Riverside Avenue and Lincoln Street site in 1903 for a cost of $100,000. James Knox Taylor, Supervising Architect of the U.S. Treasury Department, designed the building in 1906 and 1907. Construction began in 1908 and was completed in 1909.

President William Howard Taft visited the building just prior to its public opening in the fall of 1909. He praised the building's "simplicity, beauty and solidity" In early October, postal workers closed the old facility at Post street and Monroe Avenue and moved records and equipment to the new building in approximately two days with only minimal interruptions to patrons.

Only four months after the post office opened, rats were discovered in the basement. To remedy the problem, seven cats were allowed to live in the building, and the postmaster received $18 annually for each cat's care and feeding. The cats lived in the post office for at least one year, although no one is sure when the rat problem was solved.

As Spokane continued to grow and postal activity expanded, city officials realized the need to enlarge the building. The site directly north of the existing building was purchased and an addition was completed in 1941. The addition was designed by Louis A. Simon, Supervising Architect of the Public Buildings Administration of the Federal Works Administration.

In 1994, a modernization effort was completed. High efficiency lighting, modern elevators, and new HVAC equipment were installed. Important interior public spaces also underwent renovation and restoration.

The Federal Building and U.S. Post Office was listed in the National Register of Historic Places in 1983. In 2004, the building won The Office Building of the Year Award in the historic category from the Building Owners and Managers Association Northwest Region.

Architecture

The Federal Building and U.S. Post Office in Spokane, Washington, skillfully blends elements of two styles of architecture. Beaux Arts Classicism and Second Renaissance Revival were popular styles in the early years of the twentieth century. Both styles were often executed on monumental public buildings and feature rusticated ground floors and balustrades. The building's architect, James Knox Taylor, was a strong proponent of architecture inspired by Classical forms and ornamentation, which he believed appropriately conveyed the dignity of the federal government.

The exterior is finely detailed and proportioned. The symmetrical facade has a granite-faced basement level capped by a granite water table. The first story is clad in rusticated limestone and is dominated by arched openings. Cartouches (scrolled ovals) separate the first and second stories. The second and third stories are covered with smooth limestone and feature prominent Tuscan pilasters (attached columns) between window bays. The facade is topped with an entablature with a smooth frieze and medallions. The cornice contains a dentil course of small squares, a common feature on classical buildings. A parapet wall with a balustrade sits above the entablature.

The addition that was completed in 1941 blends harmoniously with the original 1909 building. Louis A. Simon, who designed the addition, appreciated both Modern and Colonial Revival forms of architecture. However, Simon designed the addition using Beaux Arts Classicism and Second Renaissance Revival styles to complement the existing building. Similar massing, material, and architectural details provide continuity.

The interior contains several ornate spaces. The first floor of the building contains formal public spaces such as the lobby, elevator vestibule, and main staircase. These areas have impressive proportions and finishes. Marble pilasters, floors, and wainscot; decorative plaster wall panels and coffered (recessed) ceilings; and terrazzo flooring are present.

The federal district courtroom and its lobby, which are located on the third floor, underwent renovation and restoration work in 1994. Marble floors and walls are located in the lobby, and the courtroom features rich details such as Ionic pilasters and decorative plasterwork. An oval skylight is set within an oval dome in the courtroom. Original stained oak rails, benches, and desks remain.

Offices are on the second and third floors. Wide corridors with terrazzo floors and marble baseboards separate perimeter offices from interior light courts.

In addition to the ornate spaces, the building contained a common feature in post offices of the era. The "sneak hole" was a specially constructed, enclosed gallery located above the postal workroom that allowed inspectors to secretly observe the actions of employees through strategically placed peep holes. The "sneak hole" is no longer in use today.

Significant events

1903: Land at Riverside Avenue and Lincoln Street purchased for new Federal building
1909: Building completed and occupied
1941: Addition completed
1983: Building listed in the National Register of Historic Places
1994: Renovation and restoration completed
2004: Building receives The Office Building of the Year Award

Building facts

Location: West 904 Riverside Avenue
Architects: James Knox Taylor; Louis A. Simon
Construction Dates: 1909; 1941
Landmark Status: Listed in the National Register of Historic Places
Architectural Style: Beaux Arts Classicism and Second Renaissance Revival
Primary Materials: Limestone; Granite
Prominent Features: Monumental Facade; Ornate First-Floor Lobby; Third-Floor Courtroom with Skylight

References

Attribution
 

National Register of Historic Places in Spokane, Washington
Beaux-Arts architecture in Washington (state)
Government buildings completed in 1909
Federal courthouses in the United States
Custom houses in the United States
Post office buildings on the National Register of Historic Places in Washington (state)
Buildings and structures in Spokane, Washington
Government buildings on the National Register of Historic Places in Washington (state)
Courthouses on the National Register of Historic Places in Washington (state)
Custom houses on the National Register of Historic Places